Milnesium asiaticum is a species of Eutardigrades in the family Milnesiidae. This species differs from its cogenerate species mainly by proportions of its claws and buccopharyngeal apparatus.

References

Further reading
 

Apochela
Animals described in 2006